Points North is a California-based rock band consisting of guitarist Eric Barnett, bassist Uriah Duffy and drummer Kevin Aiello. The band has released two studio albums and is known for its high-energy shows.  The band also does gigs as their alter ego Fred Barchetta in tribute to the band Rush adding Darby Gould (formerly of Jefferson Starship) on vocals.

Band members
Barnett was a finalist in the 2008 Guitar Superstar competition. He has also contributed tips to instrumental guitarists in Guitar Player magazine and has contributed music to video games. Duffy may be best known for bringing a fresh injection of talent to the band Whitesnake between 2006 and 2010. He joined Points North shortly after their first CD was released.

Discography
Road Less Traveled (2012)
Points North (2015)

References

External links
Official website
Band profile at Magna Carta Records

American musical trios
Magna Carta Records artists